Enrico Rossi (born 5 May 1982) is an Italian former professional road racing cyclist, who retired in 2014.

Career
Rossi was born in Cesena. His younger sister is the cyclocross rider Vania Rossi. Rossi was sacked by his  team in 2010 after being implicated in a drug-dealing ring also involving his sister. In 2014, Rossi courted further controversy when he was involved in a fight with Spanish cyclist Vicente García de Mateos at the 2014 Volta a Portugal.

Major results

2007
 1st Stage 5 Tour of Slovenia
 6th Coppa Bernocchi

2008
 1st Memorial Marco Pantani
 1st  Points classification Tour of Slovenia
 2nd Giro del Mendrisiotto

2009
 1st Stage 1 Circuit de la Sarthe
 2nd Giro della Romagna
 2nd Gran Premio dell'Insubria-Lugano
 3rd Gran Premio Bruno Beghelli
 3rd Trofeo Laigueglia
 4th Giro di Toscana
 8th Milan–San Remo

2010
 1st Dwars door Drenthe
 3rd Châteauroux Classic
 3rd Grand Prix de Denain
 3rd Giro del Friuli
 3rd Rund um Köln
 4th Trofeo Laigueglia
 5th Memorial Rik Van Steenbergen
 6th Paris–Brussels
 6th Scheldeprijs
 6th Gran Premio della Costa Etruschi
 9th Coppa Bernocchi

2012
 1st  Overall Okolo Slovenska
1st Stages 1 & 4
 1st Stage 1 Giro di Padania
 1st Stage 2 Tour de Serbie
 10th Gran Premio della Costa Etruschi

2013
 2nd Memorial Marco Pantani
 4th Poreč Trophy
 7th Coppa Bernocchi
 9th Grand Prix Šenčur

2014
 4th Rund um Köln

References

External links

1982 births
Living people
Italian male cyclists
People from Cesena
Sportspeople from the Province of Forlì-Cesena
Cyclists from Emilia-Romagna